Edward August "Kickapoo" Kippert (January 23, 1879 – June 3, 1960) was a Major League Baseball outfielder who played in two games for the Cincinnati Reds in . He also played in the minor leagues from 1906 to 1916.

External links

Cincinnati Reds players
1879 births
1960 deaths
Baseball players from Detroit
Calumet Aristocrats players
Lethbridge Miners players
Spokane Indians players
Tacoma Tigers players
Vancouver Beavers players
Montreal Royals players
Aberdeen Black Cats players
Butte Miners players
Hancock Infants players